Philosophy and Social Hope is a 1999 book written by philosopher Richard Rorty and published by Penguin. The book is a collection of cultural and political essays intended to reach a wider audience and, like his previous books, it presents Rorty's own version of pragmatism. 'Trotsky and the Wild Orchids' is the most autobiographical piece and explains how he moved from Plato's philosophical framework towards Ludwig Wittgenstein's and John Dewey's anti-essentialism.

External links 
LibraryThing – Philosophy and Social Hope
American Philosophy – Pragmatism and Social Hope

1999 non-fiction books
American essay collections
Books by Richard Rorty
Penguin Books books